There are four provinces of Ireland: Connacht (Connaught), Leinster, Munster, and Ulster. The Irish word for this territorial division, meaning "fifth part", suggests that there were once five, and at times Meath has been considered to be the fifth province; in the medieval period, however, there were often more than five. The number of provinces and their delimitation fluctuated until 1610, when they were permanently set by the English administration of James I. The provinces of Ireland no longer serve administrative or political purposes but function as historical and cultural entities.

Etymology
The modern Irish term derives from the Old Irish  (pl. ) which literally meant "a fifth". MacNeill enumerates the five earliest fifths mentioned, these comprising the kingdoms of Ulster, Connacht, Munster, Tara (North Leinster) and Dinn Riogh (South Leinster), located on the Barrow. The earliest hero tales name the Boyne as the dividing boundary between Ulster and Leinster, indicating that no province representative of Meath or Brega was yet in existence. The kings of Tara and Dinn Riogh were said to derive from the same lineage, which ruled all the Laigin. In the 12th century  (Book of Rights), the term means province, seemingly having lost its fractional meaning with seven  listed. Similarly this seems to be the case in regards to titles with the Annals of Ulster using the term  (king of the fifth/province) for certain overkings.

History

The origins of the provinces of Ireland can be traced to the medieval  (literally "fifths") or "over-kingdoms" of Ireland. There were theoretically five such over-kingdoms, however in reality during the historical period there were always more. At the start of the 9th century the following are listed: Airgíalla, Connachta, Laigin, Northern Uí Néill (Ailech), Southern Uí Néill (Mide), Mumu, and Ulaid. These seven over-kingdoms are again listed in the 12th-century .

Structure
Each over-kingdom was divided into smaller territorial units, the definition of which, whilst not consistent in Irish law tracts, followed a pattern of different grades. In theory in the early medieval period:
This pyramid structure however by the later medieval period had little validity.

Early medieval period

The kingdom of Osraige, which had its genealogy traced back by early Irish genealogists to the Laigin, was part of Mumu from the 6th to 8th century and ruled by the Corcu Loígde dynasty. By the 7th century Osraige had lost their dependence on the Corcu Loígde, with the restoration of the local Dál Birn dynasty. Osraige remained part of Mumu until 859 when Máel Sechnaill I, king of the Uí Néill, forced Mumu to surrender it to his overlordship. After this situation ended it became an independent kingdom which gradually moved towards the Laigin sphere of influence as they sought to claim the Laigin kingship. It was during the 9th century that Osraige, ruled by Cerball mac Dúnlainge, became a major political player.

Airgíalla had come under the dominance of the Ulaid, however Niall Caille, the son of Áed Oirdnide, brought it under the hegemony of the Northern Uí Néill after defeating the combined forces of the Airgíalla and Ulaid at the battle of Leth Cam in 827.

Later medieval period
After a period of dynastic infighting in the early 12th century, Osraige fragmented and after a heavy defeat at the hands of High-King Muirchertach Mac Lochlainn became part of Laigin. In 1169, the king of Osraige, Domnall Mac Gilla Pátraic, hired the Norman knight Maurice de Prendergast to resist the Laigin king, Diarmait Mac Murchada, who had also recruited Norman aid.

In 1118, the king of Connacht, Tairrdelbach Ua Conchobair, aided the Mac Cárthaigh of south Munster in a rebellion against the ruling Uí Briain dynasty. Ua Conchobair would then conquer the heartland of the Uí Briain situated around modern County Clare and make it part of Connacht. This was to force them to accept Cormac Mac Carthaig, king of Desmumu, as the king of Mumu. Despite Ua Conchobair's aid, Mac Carthaig and the Uí Briain would form an alliance to campaign against Connacht's hegemony, and by 1138 ended the threat from that kingdom. The following decades would see Mumu united and repartitioned several times as the Uí Briain and Mac Cárthaigh vied for complete control. In 1168, the king of Connacht, Ruaidrí Ua Conchobair, ensured Mumu remained divided. After Henry II, king of England, landed in Ireland in 1171, the Mac Cárthaigh submitted to him to prevent an Uí Briain invasion. The Uí Briain eventually followed suit in submitting to Henry II. The eagerness of these submissions encouraged Henry II to revive the papal grant, Laudabiliter, for Ireland.

Norman Ireland
Osraige would be amongst the first Irish kingdoms to fall following the Norman invasion of Ireland in 1170, and was soon afterwards split from Leinster and made part of the royal demesne lands of Waterford.

In the years following the invasion, the kingdoms of Connacht, Desmumu, Laigin, Mide, Tuadmumu, and Ulaid formed the basis for the Norman liberties of Connacht, Desmond, Leinster, Meath, Thomond and Ulster respectively. These liberties were later subdivided into smaller ones that became the basis for the counties of Ireland.

The Northern Uí Néill remained outside of Norman control, eventually absorbing the greater part of Airgíalla, which had by the end of the 12th century lost its eastern territory (afterwards known as "English Oriel" and later as Louth) to the Normans. Airgíalla would eventually no longer be reckoned an over-kingdom however it survived in present-day County Monaghan for as long as the Gaelic order survived, with the last king of Airgíalla being Hugh Roe McMahon, who reigned from 1589 until his execution in September/October 1590.

With the collapse of English control in Ireland following the Bruce campaign in Ireland in 1315, and the subsequent collapse of the Earldom of Ulster, the Gaelic order had a resurgence and the Clandeboye O'Neills of the Northern Uí Néill stepped into the power vacuum in Ulster bringing it under the sovereignty of the O'Neills of Tyrone. This reduced the number of provinces to five—Connact, Leinster, Meath, Munster, and Ulster.

Tudor period

During the reign of Mary I (1553–1558), the Lord Deputy of Ireland, Thomas Radclyffe, 3rd Earl of Sussex, sought to divide Ireland into six parts—Connaught, Leinster, Meath, Nether Munster, Ulster, and Upper Munster. His administrative reign in Ireland however was cut short and even with his reappointment by Elizabeth I (1558–1603) this plan was never implemented.

Sir Henry Sidney during his three tenures as Lord Deputy created two presidencies headed by a Lord President to administer Connaught and Munster. In an attempt to reduce the importance of the province of Munster, Sydney, using the River Shannon as a natural boundary took Thomond and made it into the county of Clare as part of the presidency of Connaught in 1569. Around 1600 near the end of Elizabeth's reign, Clare was made an entirely distinct presidency of its own under the Earls of Thomond and would not return to being part of Munster until after the Restoration in 1660.

The exact boundaries of the provinces of Ireland during the Tudor period changed several times, usually as a result of the creation of new counties:
County Clare upon its creation in 1569 was transferred from Munster to Connacht, and was only restored to Munster after 1660.
County Longford upon its creation in 1583 was transferred from Leinster to Connacht.
County Cavan was created in 1584 and transferred from Connacht to Ulster.
County Louth, which had long been part of The Pale, was transferred from Ulster to Leinster.

It would not be until the reign of Elizabeth's successor, James I, that Meath by 1610 would cease to be considered a province and that the provincial borders would be permanently set.

Prehistory
In this period Ireland is said to have been divided into five independent over-kingdoms, or  whose  (kings) were of equal rank, not subject to a central monarchy. Pseudo-historians called this era , which has been translated as: "Time of the Pentarchs"; "Time of the Five Fifths"; and "Time of the provincial kings". It was also described as "the Pentarchy".

The five provinces that made up the Pentarchy where:
 (North Leinster), with its royal seat at Tara (before it became the seat of the High King).

Historians Geoffrey Keating and T. F. O'Rahilly differ suggesting that it is Munster, not Leinster, that formed two of the fifths. He also cites that the  makes mention of the four fifths of Ireland that waged war on Ulster, which made reference to only one Munster. Another reason given by MacNeill was a problem made by Keating himself. The boundaries given by Keating himself for the five provinces however meant that this would have been highly unlikely, with the boundary between his Munster fifths nowhere near this area.

Pseudo-historians list 84 kings of Ireland prior to the formation of the Pentarchy. When this mythical kingship was interrupted is a matter of dispute. The Annals of Tigernach state that Ireland was divided into the five upon the slaying of Conaire Mór, however it is suggested alternatively that it happened upon the death of Conaire's father, Eterscél Mór, the 84th king of Ireland. Keating however suggests it occurred in the reign of Eochu Feidlech who was the 82nd king of Ireland.

MacNeill claims that this division of Ireland into five is pre-historic and pre-Gaelic, describing the Pentarchy as "the oldest certain fact in the political history of Ireland". The notion of Ireland being divided into five permeated itself throughout Irish literature over the centuries despite what the  representing no longer existing by the time of Saint Patrick in the 5th century. By then, Ireland had become divided into seven over-kingdoms.

The Three Collas and the founding of Airgíalla
The main body of the events in the myth of the Three Collas may have occurred in the late 4th to early 5th century, however as the centuries passed the myth underwent updating and alteration.

In it the Three Collas—Colla Menn, Colla Da Crioch, and Colla Uais—were the sons of Eocaidh Doimlén. It is from them that the Airgíalla are said to descend, branching off from the rest of the Connachta. The Northern and Southern Uí Néill dynasties are claimed to descend from Eocaidh's brother, Fiacha Sraibhtine. According to the story the Collas were told by Fiacha's son, Muiredach Tirech, the High King of Ireland, to conquer land of their own to pass on to their descendants, directing them to wage war on the Ulaid to avenge a slight against their great-grandfather Cormac mac Airt.

The Collas with their army along with a host from Connacht marched to Achaidh Leithdeircc in Fernmagh, southern Ulaid, and fought the Ulaid in seven battles over the course of seven days. The host from Connacht fought the first six battles, and the Collas fought the seventh. It is after this last battle that the king of Ulaid, Fergus Foga, was killed and his army routed. The Collas then pursued the Ulaid east of the "Glen Righe" (the valley of the Newry River in eastern County Armagh), before returning to loot and burn the Ulaid capital, Emain Macha, after which it never again had a king. They then took possession of central Ulaid spanning the modern counties of Armagh, Fermanagh, Londonderry, Monaghan and Tyrone founding the over-kingdom of Airgíalla.

Usage

In modern times the provinces have become associated with groups of counties, although they have no legal status. They are today seen mainly in a sporting context. Ireland's four professional rugby teams in the United Rugby Championship play under the names of the provinces. The Gaelic Athletic Association (GAA) has separate provincial councils and its county teams contest provincial championships.

Six of the nine Ulster counties form modern-day Northern Ireland, which is part of the United Kingdom. Many of Northern Ireland's unionist political parties use "Ulster" in their names such as the Ulster Unionist Party (UUP) and the Ulster Democratic Party (DUP). The ITV regional service is known as Ulster Television but generally abbreviated to UTV, while BBC Radio Ulster is the main BBC radio station from BBC Northern Ireland.  

In education Munster Technological University and Ulster University both use the provinces in which they are located in their name.  

Many hotels also use the name of the province in which they are situated.  

In media many local and regional newspapers use their province in their names such as The Munster Express in Waterford, Leinster Leader in Kildare, Connacht Tribune in Galway and Ulster Herald in Fermanagh.  

The proposal was particularly associated with the Dublin-based leadership group centred on Ruairí Ó Brádaigh and Dáithí Ó Conaill, who were the authors of the policy.  envisaged a united Ireland that would be created when the British withdrew from Northern Ireland, and the creation of a federal state with assemblies for each of its four historic provinces.

Coats of arms

Each province is today represented by its own unique arms and flag. These are joined to represent various All Ireland sports teams and organisations via the Four Provinces Flag of Ireland and a four province Crest of Ireland, with examples including the Ireland national field hockey team, Ireland national rugby league team, Ireland national rugby union team and Irish Amateur Boxing Association.

Demographics and politics

Poetic description

Ard Ruide

The  poem named  (Ruide Headland) poetically describes the five kingdoms of Ireland. Below is a translation from Old Irish:

The Táin
The epic poem, An Táin Bó Cúailnge (the Cattle Raid of Cooley) describes a war between Connacht and Ulster, and is perhaps best known for CúChulainn's single handed defence of Ulster against the champions of Connacht in turn, while his comrades were disabled by a spell.

See also 

 ISO 3166-2:IE
 Counties of Ireland
 Kings of Ulster
 Kings of Munster
 Kings of Mide
 Kings of Connacht
 Kings of Leinster
 Kings of Airgíalla
 Kings of Ailech

Notes

References

Citations

General sources 

 
 
 
 
 
 .
 
 
 
 .
 
 
 

 
Ireland
Lists of subdivisions of Ireland
Subdivisions of Ireland